A dicycle (also known as a diwheel) is a vehicle with two parallel wheels, side by side, unlike single-track vehicles such as motorcycles and bicycles, which have two wheels inline. Originally used to refer to devices with large wheels and pedals, the term is now used in relation to powered self-balancing scooters with smaller wheels and no pedals such as the Segway PT and the self-balancing hoverboard.

Etymology
In more recent usage, "dicycle" has been used for both pedaled and motorised vehicles with wheels of varying sizes, as long as they share a common axis, though not necessarily a common axle. In 2017, the Merriam-Webster's dictionary, limited usage to 'velocipedes with two parallel wheels,' and the Oxford English Dictionary limited it to 'pedal-powered vehicles with large wheels placed parallel to each other'.

Examples

Segway PT
The Segway PT is a two-wheeled self-balancing personal transporter which uses computers, sensors, and electric motors to keep the device upright. The rider commands the PT to go forward or backward by shifting their weight forward or backward on the platform. Invented by Dean Kamen, it is produced by Segway Inc.

Self-balancing scooter
The self-balancing scooter is a category of personal transporter which includes all self-balancing powered portable devices with two parallel wheels that includes the Segway PT, the Segway miniPRO and the self-balancing hoverboard.

Diwheel design 

The diwheel design has the two large outer wheels completely encompassing an inner frame. The inner frame is free to rotate within the wheels, and is typically supported by a common axle or idlers which roll on the wheels (see figure). Diwheels, like their more popular cousins the monowheel, have been around for almost one and a half centuries. All of these platforms suffer from two common issues affecting driver comfort; slosh and tumbling (also known as gerbilling). Sloshing is when the inner frame oscillates, and it occurs in all monowheels and diwheels where the centre of gravity of the inner frame is offset from the centre line of the wheels. It is very prevalent as these platforms typically have low damping between the wheel and the frame, to minimise power consumption during locomotion. In addition, during severe braking or acceleration the inner frame will tumble relative to the earth centred frame, which affects the ability of the driver to control the platform.  Both the sloshing and tumbling issue can be controlled through feedback control, and has been demonstrated successfully. The equations of motion for the diwheel have been published.

Gallery

See also

References

External links
 US Patent Class 180/240 (lists all the vehicles coming under powered dicycles).
 Dicycles and Diwheels throughout history
 Dicyclet - pedal driven Dicycle by Dutch artist Fred Abels
 EDWARD, an electric dicycle by University of Adelaide students
Di-Cycle: A Bike That Travels Over Land and Water

Land vehicles